The 1969 Buffalo Bulls football team represented the University at Buffalo in the 1969 NCAA University Division football season. The Bulls offense scored 174 points while the defense allowed 89 points.

Schedule

Roster

References

Buffalo
Buffalo Bulls football seasons
Buffalo Bulls football